Beyözü is a village in the Mecitözü District of Çorum Province in Turkey. Its population is 314 (2022). It is close to the site of the ancient city of Euchaita.

References

Villages in Mecitözü District